This is a list of venues used for professional baseball in Chicago. The information is a synthesis of the information contained in the references listed.

Dexter Park
Home of: Chicago White Stockings, independent professional club (1870)
Location: Halsted Street (east), between 47th Street (south) and the imaginary line of 42nd Street (north). Adjacent to Union Stock Yards.
Later: site of International Amphitheatre
Currently: Uniform services plant

Ogden Park
Home of: Chicago White Stockings (1870) – some games
Location: East of where Ontario Street (at that time) T-ed into Michigan Avenue.
Currently: hotels and other businesses

Union Base-Ball Grounds a.k.a. White-Stocking Park
Home of: Chicago White Stockings – National Association (1871)
Location: Randolph (north), Michigan Avenue (west); Northwest corner of Lake Park (now known as Grant Park) – diamond roughly in southwest corner of field
Currently: Millennium Park

23rd Street Grounds
Home of:
Neutral site for some out-of-town clubs' games (1872–1873)
Chicago White Stockings – NA (1874–1875), National League (1876–1877)
Fairbanks - League Alliance (1877)
Location: 23rd Street (north); Dearborn Street (east); 24th Street (south); railroad tracks (west)
Currently: athletic field

Lake Park a.k.a. Lake-Shore Park a.k.a. White-Stocking Park
Home of: Chicago White Stockings – NL (1878–1884)
Location: Same as 1871 site – diamond roughly in south part of field
Currently: Millennium Park

South Side Park (I) a.k.a. 39th Street Grounds (I)
Home of: Chicago – Union Association (1884)
Location: 39th Street (now Pershing Road) (south); South Wabash Avenue (west); 38th Street (north); South Michigan Avenue (east) – a few blocks east and southeast of the later south side ballparks

West Side Park (I)
Home of:
Chicago White Stockings – NL (1885–1891)
Chicago Maroons - Western Association (1888)
Also used as a neutral site for one game in the 1887 World Series
Location: Congress Street (north, left field); Loomis Street (west, home plate); Harrison Street (south, right field); Throop Street (east, center field)
Currently: Chicago World Language Academy (1340 West Harrison Street)

South Side Park (II)
Home of:
Chicago Pirates – PL (1890)
Chicago White Stockings – NL (1891 – mid-1893)
Notes: Split schedule with West Side Park (I) in 1891 and West Side Park (II) in 1893
Location: 35th Street (south, center field); South Wentworth Avenue (east, left field); 33rd Street (north, home plate); railroad tracks (west, right field) - same footprint later occupied by Comiskey Park and Armour Square Park
Currently: Parking lot and/or Dan Ryan Expressway

West Side Park (II) a.k.a. West Side Grounds
Home of: Chicago White Stockings – NL (mid-1893–1915)
Location: Polk Street (north, third base); Lincoln (now Wolcott) Street (west, first base); Wood Street (east, left field); flats and Taylor Street (south, right field)
Currently: University of Illinois College of Medicine

South Side Park (III) a.k.a. 39th Street Grounds (II) renamed Schorling's Park
Home of: Chicago White Sox – American League (1900 – mid-1910); Chicago American Giants – Negro leagues (1911–1940)
Location: 39th Street (now Pershing Road) (south, first base); South Wentworth Avenue (east, right field); South Princeton Avenue (west, third base); line of 38th Street (north, left field) – a few blocks south of the Comiskey Park sites
Currently: Wentworth Gardens housing project

Comiskey Park a.k.a. White Sox Park (1960s-1970s)
Home of: Chicago White Sox – AL (mid-1910 – 1990); Chicago American Giants – Negro leagues (1941-ca.1950)
Location: 324 West 35th Street – 35th Street (south, first base); Shields Street (west); 34th Street (north, left field); Wentworth Avenue (east, right field) and Dan Ryan Expressway (farther east)
Currently: Parking lot

Gunther Park
Home of: Chicago Green Sox - United States Baseball League (1912 only)
Location: Clark Street (east); Leland Avenue (south)
Currently: Chase Park

DePaul University Field
Home of: Chicago Chi-Feds/Whales – Federal League (1913)
Location: Belden Avenue (north); Sheffield Avenue (east); University buildings and Webster Avenue (south); Osgood Street (west)
Currently: DePaul student center and parking lots 

Wrigley Field originally Weeghman Park, then Cubs Park
Home of: Chicago Chi-Feds/Whales – Federal League (1914–1915); Chicago Cubs – NL (1916–present)
Location: 1060 West Addison Street (south, first base); Clark Street (southwest and west, home plate); Waveland Avenue (north, left field); Sheffield Avenue (east, right field)

Guaranteed Rate Field originally "New Comiskey Park", then U.S. Cellular Field
Home of: Chicago White Sox – AL (1991–present)
Location: 333 West 35th Street, across the street to the south from "Old" Comiskey Park – 35th Street (north, third base); site of Shields Street (west, first base); Wentworth Avenue (east, left field) and Dan Ryan Expressway (farther east); parking and Wells Street (south, right field)

See also
Lists of baseball parks

References

Baseball Memories, by Marc Okkonen, Sterling Publishing, 1992.

External links
DePaul athletic field on Sanborn map, 1910
DePaul athletic field on Sanborn map, 1935

Chicago
Baseball parks
Baseball